David McNab (? – ?) was an footballer who played as a defender for Fulham. He played in 158 matches in the league for Fulham, and 169 matches in all competitions, scoring 21 goals.

Fulham F.C. players
English Football League players
Association football defenders
English footballers